The Peckham by-election of 28 October 1982 was held after the death of Labour Member of Parliament (MP) Harry Lamborn on 21 August 1982. The seat was retained for Labour by Harriet Harman.

Results

Note: The change in the Social Democrat vote is calculated against the votes won by the Liberal Party at the 1979 general election, as the two parties had formed the SDP-Liberal Alliance.

References

Peckham by-election
Peckham,1982
Peckham,1982
Peckham by-election
Peckham
Peckham by-election